Family Law is a Canadian legal drama television series that premiered in Italy on Sky Investigation (local version of Sky Witness) on July 6, 2021, and on Global on September 16, 2021. The series premiered on The CW in the United States on October 2, 2022.

Premise
Abigail Bianchi, a recovering alcoholic and lawyer, goes to work with her estranged father and two half-siblings. She has never worked in family law before and suddenly finds herself having to manage not just her clients' family dysfunction, but her own. She must learn to navigate working with her father and siblings she does not know as part of her probation, all while trying to maintain her sobriety.

Cast and characters

Main
 Jewel Staite as Abigail (Abby) Bianchi, a recovering alcoholic lawyer who hits rock bottom after a video of her vomiting in court goes viral.
 Victor Garber as Harry Svensson, Abigail's estranged father and boss. Married three times; first to Abigail's mother, second to Daniel's mother, and last to Lucy's mother.
 Zach Smadu as Daniel Svensson, Abigail's half-brother and lawyer who is working for his father.
 Genelle Williams as Lucy Svensson, Abigail's half-sister, her mother died when she was eight. A divorced lesbian psychiatrist.

Recurring
 Bobbi Charlton as Jerri Rifkin
 Luke Camilleri as Frank Bianchi, Abigail's ex-husband
 Lauren Holly as Joanne Kowalski, Abigail's mother and Harry's first wife
 Eden Summer Gilmore as Sofia Bianchi, Abigail's daughter
 Brendan Sunderland as Nico Bianchi, Abigail's son
 Brett Kelly as Cecil Patterson
 Yvonne Chapman as Danielle Lim, Daniel's ex-fiancée (season 1)
 Ali Liebert as Maggie Roth, Lucy's ex-wife who is a paramedic
 Celia Reid as Asha, the woman who Lucy is having an affair with (season 1)
 Kelli Ogmundson as Nina Beasley, the receptionist at Svensson Associates
 Ryan Lino as Winston Verdad, the receptionist, who takes over for Nina (season 2)
 BJ Harrison as Cordelia, Abby's divorce lawyer and Harry's old flame
 Peter Bryant as Phillip Sterling, a lawyer and a friend of Harry
 Birkett Turton as Yannick Krol, a lawyer and a friend of Daniel

Episodes

Series Overview

Season 1 (2021)

Season 2 (2022)

Production
On December 20, 2019, Corus Entertainment announced that the series created by Susin Nielsen for SEVEN24 Films and Lark Productions had been given a ten-episode series order. Executive produced by Tom Cox, Jordy Randall and Erin Haskett, the show would be produced and set in Vancouver, British Columbia.

In February 2020, it was reported that principal photography would begin on March 2, 2020. The primary cast members were announced as being all Canadian - Jewel Staite, Victor Garber, Zach Smadu and Genelle Williams.

In advance of the series premiere, Global announced in May 2021 that it had already renewed for a second season.

On May 17, 2022, Global announced a third season, once again with ten episodes.

Release

International
The series premiered in Italy on Sky Investigation on July 6, 2021. International distribution is being managed by eOne.

Nine Network is carrying the series in Australia.

In the United States, The CW picked up the series in May 2022, and it airs Sunday nights at 8:00 PM, premiering on October 2, 2022, in the 2022-2023 United States television network season.

Season 2 was premiered in March 2022.

Ratings

Notes

References

External links
 
 

English-language television shows
2021 Canadian television series debuts
2020s Canadian drama television series
Canadian legal television series
Television shows filmed in Vancouver
Television shows set in Vancouver
Global Television Network original programming
Television series about families